Cutler Bay is an incorporated town in Miami-Dade County, Florida, United States, established in 2005. With a population of 45,425 as of the 2020 census, Cutler Bay is the 9th most populous of the 34 municipalities that make up Miami's urban core, and the 33rd most populous of the 163 municipalities that make up the Miami-Fort Lauderdale-Pompano Beach Metropolitan Area.

History
The town was named after Dr. William Cutler of Massachusetts, who visited the area north of the town around 1880 and encouraged others to settle in what became the pioneer town of Cutler.

The Charles Deering Estate, located in nearby Palmetto Bay, contains the Cutler Fossil Site where mammoths, saber-toothed tigers and California condors are among the many fossil records. The park holds archeological evidence of Native American habitation of the land 10,000 years ago. Tequesta burial mounds are also found there. The area called Cutler Ridge had been called the "Hunting Ground" by some of the earliest Caucasian settlers in the area, circa 1825.

In the early 1900s the Florida East Coast Railway was extended south to Cutler, which was located near what is now the Charles Deering Estate. Cutler then served as the place where people settling in the undeveloped Homestead, area went to get their supplies.

In 1992, Hurricane Andrew made landfall near Cutler Ridge. The storm left the area in "almost total destruction". The dense vegetation near the shore and the dense subdivision development of the area are thought to have been factors which mitigated the extent of areas impacted by flood damage caused by Andrew. However, nearly every building suffered major damage from the wind, and the damage in Florida was estimated at $25 billion, the most expensive natural disaster in US history to that point.

In May 2002, the Cutler Bay Steering Committee company met to discuss the formation of a municipal advisory committee, where the committee would advise on the incorporation of the Cutler Ridge area into the city of Cutler Ridge. The decision to incorporate was spurred in part by the efforts to recover from Hurricane Andrew. The proposed incorporation boundaries included Southwest 184th Street on the north and Southwest 216th and 224th streets on the south. In addition, the west boundary would include the Turnpike, U.S. 1 and Southwest 112th Avenue, and Biscayne Bay would serve as the east boundary.

In April 2005, the Charter committee members looked at over a dozen names for the city, ranging from "Pine Ridge" and "Cutler Bay" to just "Cutler". They reduced the choices to "Cutler Ridge" and "Old Cutler Bay". In November 2005, voters approved the charter and chose the name "Cutler Bay" for the county's 35th municipality, over "Cutler Ridge" by a vote of 1,920 to 1,403. In the months following the name change, many of those born and raised in the area that had been known as Cutler Ridge since the 1870s refused to accept the new name.

Geography

The town's northern border runs from SW 184th Street (Eureka Drive) east of US 1 to the coast. The southern border is SW 232nd Street, north of Black Point Marina, the largest public marina in the Miami area. The town's boundaries include the northeast section of Biscayne National Park, areas formerly known as Cutler Ridge to the west, and the neighborhood and former CDP of Lakes by the Bay to the east. The town is bordered to the north by the village of Palmetto Bay, to the west by unincorporated South Miami Heights, and to the southwest by unincorporated Goulds.

Cutler Ridge has been incorporated into the hurricane emergency plans for the area as lands east of the ridge are subject to storm surge, but areas west of the ridge would generally be protected.

Due to Cutler Bay's position in a flat, low-lying coastal wetland area on Biscayne Bay, the area is prone to flooding. During the rainy season, Cutler Bay's many canals, channels, and lakes are frequently full of water, and the groundwater table also is full and close to the surface. Flood hazards include rainfall from tropical storms, hurricanes, and other heavy rain events.

Demographics

2020 census

As of the 2020 United States census, there were 45,425 people, 13,110 households, and 10,215 families residing in the town.

2010 census

As of 2015, there were 13,935 households, out of which 7.8% were vacant. In 2010, the population distribution was: 6.8% under 5 years old, 25.8% under the age of 18, and 10.6% 65 years of age or older. Females were 51.7% of the population. The median income for a household was $61.370. The per capita income for the town was $25,193. About 10.5% of the population were below the poverty line.

2000 census
As of 2000, speakers of English as a first language accounted for 58.89%, while Spanish made up 38.18%, and French Creole comprised 1.31% of the population. According to the latest American Community Survey of 2008–2012 conducted by the US Census Bureau, the percentage of people who spoke English as their main language was of 44.1%, while Spanish speakers were at 50.4% of the population, and other languages accounted for 5.5%.

Government and infrastructure
Cutler Bay is governed by a five-member Town Council and operates under a Council-Manager form of government. Three Council Members are elected to represent specific residential areas (Seats 1, 2 & 3) and must reside in their respective area. The Mayor and the Vice Mayor may reside anywhere in the Town. Town Council elections are non-partisan. As the legislative body of the Town, the Town Council determines policy, adopts the annual budget and makes laws. The Miami-Dade Police Department operates the South District Station in Cutler Bay.

In January 2006, Cutler Bay elected former Florida state legislator John F. Cosgrove as its first mayor. Mayor Cosgrove died on April 19, 2006, while vacationing in Zimbabwe. Vice Mayor Paul Vrooman assumed the position of Mayor. In November 2010, Edward P. MacDougall was elected Mayor from Vice Mayor. Prior to incorporation Edward MacDougall chaired the municipal charter committee which set the Town's charter. In November 2014, Peggy Bell, who was one of the original Council Members when Cutler Bay was incorporated, was elected Mayor and served as Mayor until she reached her term limits in November 2018. Elected in November 2018, the current office of Mayor is held by former Council member Tim Meerbott.

The community bought an office building, Cutler Bay Town Center, circa 2010; in 2020 the building was about 33% occupied. The city government planned to make money by leasing space in the building, but buyers did not materialize.

Education

Primary and secondary schools
Miami-Dade County Public Schools operates public schools.

Elementary schools in the town limits include:
 Bel-Aire Elementary School
 Cutler Ridge Elementary School
 Gulfstream Elementary School
 Dr. Edward L. Whigham Elementary School
 Whispering Pines Elementary School
Cutler Bay Middle School and Cutler Bay Senior High School are in Cutler Bay. Prior to 2012 Cutler Bay had two middle schools (Centennial and Cutler Ridge), and Miami Southridge High School was the zoned school. Centennial was converted into a high school and Cutler Ridge became the sole middle school of Cutler Bay.

The charter school Mater Academy Cutler Bay is in Cutler Bay.

The Roman Catholic Archdiocese of Miami operates Catholic schools. Our Lady of the Holy Rosary-St. Richard School, a K–8 school, is in Cutler Bay.

Colleges and universities
College of Business and Technology (Cutler Bay Campus)

Media
The Miami Herald provides news coverage for the town under the Cutler Bay heading of its "Miami-Dade Communities" section.

Surrounding areas
  Palmetto Bay
  West Perrine    Palmetto Bay
 Unincorporated Miami-Dade County, South Miami Heights, Goulds   Biscayne Bay
  Goulds, Princeton    Lakes by the Bay
  Unincorporated Miami-Dade County, Lakes by the Bay

References

Further reading
 U.S. Census Bureau maps:
 Census 2000 Block Map: Cutler Ridge CDP - Pages 1, 2, 3, and 4.
 1990 U.S. Census Map of Miami-Dade County, with Cutler Ridge on Page 5

External links

 

Towns in Miami-Dade County, Florida
Towns in Florida
Populated places on the Intracoastal Waterway in Florida
Populated places established in 2005